Korea's provinces (Do; hangul: 도;) have been the primary administrative division of Korea since the mid Goryeo dynasty in the early 11th century, and were preceded by provincial-level divisions (Ju and Mok) dating back to Unified Silla, in the late 7th century.

During the Unified Silla Period (AD 668–935), Korea was divided into nine Ju (주), an old word for "province" that was used to name both the kingdom's provinces and its provincial capitals. 

After Goryeo defeated Silla and Later Baekje in 935 and 936 respectively, the new kingdom "was divided into one royal district (Ginae; 기내) and twelve administrative districts (Mok; 목)" (Nahm 1988), which were soon redivided into ten provinces (Do). In 1009 the country was again redivided, this time into one royal district, five provinces (Do) and two frontier districts (Gye; 계; ?).

After the Joseon dynasty's rise to power and the formation of Joseon in 1392, the country was redivided into eight new provinces (Do) in 1413. The provincial boundaries closely reflected major regional and dialect boundaries, and are still often referred to in Korean today simply as the Eight Provinces (Paldo). In 1895, as part of the Gabo Reform, the country was redivided into 23 districts (Bu; 부), which were replaced a year later by thirteen new provinces.

The thirteen provinces of 1896 included three of the original eight provinces, with the five remaining original provinces divided into north and south halves (Bukdo (북도) and Namdo (남도) respectively). The thirteen provinces remained unchanged throughout the period of Japanese annexation.

With the liberation of Korea in 1945, the Korean peninsula was divided into North Korea and South Korea, with the dividing line established along the 38th parallel. As a result, three provinces—Hwanghae, Gyeonggi, and Gangwon (Kangwŏn)—were divided into North Korea and South Korea today.

The special cities of Seoul (South Korea) and P'yŏngyang (North Korea) were formed in 1946. Between 1946 and 1954, five new provinces were created: Jeju in South Korea, and North and South Hwanghae, Chagang, and Ryanggang in North Korea.

Since 1954, provincial boundaries in both the North and South have remained unchanged but new cities and special administrative regions have been created.

Provinces of Unified Silla

In 660, the southeastern kingdom of Silla conquered Baekje in the Southwest, and in 668, Silla conquered Goguryeo in the north with the help of China's Tang dynasty. For the first time, most of the Korean peninsula was ruled by a single power. Silla's northern boundary ran through the middle of southern Goguryeo, from the Taedong River (which flows through P'yŏngyang) in the west to Wŏnsan in modern-day Kangwon Province in the east. In 721, Silla solidified its northern boundary with Balhae (which replaced Goguryeo in the north) by building a wall between P'yŏngyang and Wŏnsan.

The country's capital was Geumseong (modern-day Gyeongju), and sub-capital known as So-gyeongs(소경,小京) were located at Geumgwan-gyeong (금관경,Gimhae), Namwon-gyeong(남원경), Seowon-gyeong (서원경,Cheongju), Jungwon-gyeong (중원경,Chungju), and Bugwon-gyeong (북원경,Wonju).

The country was divided into nine provinces (주,Ju): three in the pre-660 territory of Silla, and three each in the former kingdoms of Baekje and Goguryeo.

The table below lists the three preceding kingdoms, each province's name in the Roman alphabet, hangul, and hanja, as well as the provincial capital, and the equivalent modern-day province.

Provinces of Goryeo

In 892, Gyeon Hwon founded the kingdom of Later Baekje in southwestern Silla, and in 918, Wang Geon (King Taejo) established the kingdom of Goryeo in the northwest, with its capital at Songak (modern-day Kaesŏng). In 935, Goryeo conquered the remnants of Silla, and in 936, it conquered Later Baekje. Songak was greatly expanded and renamed Gaegyeong. Taejo expanded the country's territory by conquering part of the land formerly belonging to Goguryeo, in the northwest of the Korean peninsula, as far north as the Amnok River (Yalu River). A wall was constructed from the Amnok River in the northwest to the Sea of Japan (East Sea) in the southeast, on the boundary between Goryeo and the northeastern Jurchen territory.

The country had one capital (Gaegyeong) and three sub-capitals: Donggyeong (modern-day Gyeongju and the former capital of Silla), Namgyeong (modern-day Seoul), and Seogyeong (modern-day P'yŏngyang).

Originally, the country had one royal district (Ginae; 기내) around Gaegyeong and twelve administrative districts (Mok; 목): (Note that Gwangju-mok is modern-day Gwangju-si in Gyeonggi Province, not the larger Gwangju Metropolitan City.)

The twelve districts were soon redivided into ten provinces (Do; 도). Gwannae-do included the administrative districts of Yangju, Hwangju, Gwangju, and Haeju; Jungwon-do included Chungju and Cheongju; Hanam-do replaced Gongju; Gangnam-do replaced Jeonju; Yeongnam-do replaced Sangju; Sannam-do replaced Jinju; and Haeyang-do replaced Naju and Seungju; the three other new provinces were Yeongdong-do, Sakbang-do, and Paeseo-do.

Finally, in 1009, the ten provinces were again redivided, this time into five provinces (Do) and two frontier districts (Gye; 계).

The table below lists the provinces of Silla, the administrative districts of Goryeo that replaced them, then the pre- and post-1009 provinces, as well as their modern equivalents.

Provinces of Joseon

 

In 1413, Korea (at that time called Joseon) was divided into eight provinces: Chungcheong, Gangwon, Gyeonggi, Gyeongsang, Jeolla, Hamgyŏng (originally called Yeonggil), Hwanghae (originally called P'unghae), and P'yŏngan.

Districts of Late Joseon period
In 1895, Korea was redivided into 23 districts (Bu; 부), each named for the city or county that was its capital. The districts were short-lived, however, as the following year, the provincial system was restored.

Andong
Chuncheon
Chungju
Daegu
Dongnae
Gangneung
Gongju
Haeju
Hamhŭng
Hanseong
Hongju
Incheon
Jeju
Jeonju
Jinju
Kaesŏng
Kanggye
Kapsan
Kyŏngsŏng
Naju
Namwon
P'yŏngyang
Ŭiju

Provinces of the Korean Empire
In 1896, the former eight provinces were restored, with five of them (Chungcheong, Gyeongsang, Jeolla, Hamgyŏng, and P'yŏngan) being divided into North and South Provinces (Bukdo (북도) and Namdo (남도) respectively). The resulting system of thirteen provinces lasted until the Division of Korea in 1945.

The thirteen provinces were: North and South Chungcheong, Gangwon, Gyeonggi, North and South Gyeongsang, North and South Hamgyŏng, Hwanghae, North and South Jeolla, and North and South P'yŏngan.

Provinces of Korea under Japanese colonial rule 

Under Japanese rule, Korean provinces remained much the same, only taking on the Japanese reading of the hanja. The Provinces of Chōsen were:

Provincial divisions since the division of Korea

At the end of World War II in 1945, Korea was divided into Northern Korea and Southern Korea under trusteeship of the Soviet Union and the United States. The peninsula was divided at the 38th parallel in 1945. In 1948, the two zones became the independent countries of North Korea and South Korea.

Three provinces—Hwanghae, Gyeonggi, and Gangwon—were divided by the 38th parallel.

Most of Hwanghae Province belonged to the Northern zone. The southern portion became part of Gyeonggi Province in the south.
Most of Gyeonggi Province belonged to the Southern zone. In 1946, the northern portion became part of Hwanghae Province in the north.
Gangwon Province was divided roughly in half, to form modern-day Gangwon Province in South Korea and Kangwon Province in North Korea. The northern province is expanded in 1946 to include some area around the city of Wonsan (Originally part of South Hamgyong Province)

Also in 1946, the cities of Seoul in the south and Pyongyang in the north separated from Gyeonggi and South Pyongan Provinces respectively to become Special Cities. Both North Korea and South Korea have subsequently upgraded other cities to a level equal to a province, and these cities (special cities of North Korea and special cities of South Korea [qq.v.]) are sometimes counted along with provinces.

Finally, the new provinces of Jeju Province (in the south, in 1946) and Chagang Province (in the north, 1949) were formed, from parts of South Jeolla and North Pyongan respectively. In 1954, Ryanggang Province was split from South Hamgyong and Hwanghae was divided into North and South Hwanghae Provinces.

The following table lists the present provincial divisions in the Korean Peninsula.

Notes 1 See Names of Seoul.

See also
List of South Korean regions by GDP
List of provinces of Balhae

Notes

References
 Nahm, Andrew C. (1988). Korea: Tradition and Transformation - A History of the Korean People. Elizabeth, NJ: Hollym International.
 Nahm 1988 (in Korean).

External links
 
 

 
Provinces
Korea
Subdivisions of Korea